Francium chloride is a radioactive chemical compound with the formula FrCl. It is a salt predicted to be a white solid and is soluble in water. Its properties resemble caesium chloride.

Production
It is produced by the reaction of hydrochloric acid with francium metal:
2Fr + 2HCl → 2FrCl + H2
It is also expected to be produced by the violent reaction of francium and chlorine gas.

References

Francium compounds
chlorides